The canton of Carpentras-Sud is a French former administrative division in the department of Vaucluse and region Provence-Alpes-Côte d'Azur. It had 41,948 inhabitants (2012). It was disbanded following the French canton reorganisation which came into effect in March 2015.

Composition
The communes in the canton of Carpentras-Sud:
Althen-des-Paluds
Carpentras (partly)
Entraigues-sur-la-Sorgue
Mazan
Monteux

References

Carpentras-Sud
2015 disestablishments in France
States and territories disestablished in 2015